Orzechowski (feminine Orzechowska, plural Orzechowscy) is a Polish surname. Notable people with the surname include:

 Artur Orzechowski, Polish diplomat
 Barbara Orzechowska-Ryszel (born 1931), Polish fencer
 Benjamin Orzechowski (1947–2000), birth name of Benjamin Orr, American rock musician, member of The Cars
 Daniel Orzechowski (born 1985), Brazilian swimmer
 Marian Orzechowski (born 1931), Polish politician
 Mirosław Orzechowski (born 1957), Polish politician
 Piotr Orzechowski (born 1990), Polish jazz pianist, also known as Pianohooligan
 Robert Orzechowski (born 1989), Polish handballer
 Stanisław Orzechowski (1513–1566), Ruthenian and Polish political writer and theologian
 Tom Orzechowski (born 1953), American comic book letterer

See also
 

Polish-language surnames